USS Traveler and USS Traveller have been the name of more than one United States Navy ship, and may refer to:

 , a supply boat in commission in 1805
 , a patrol boat in commission from 1917 to 1919

United States Navy ship names